2 Chronicles 35 is the thirty-fifth chapter of the Second Book of Chronicles in the Old Testament of the Christian Bible or of the second part of the Books of Chronicles in the Hebrew Bible. The book was compiled from older sources by an unknown person or group, designated by modern scholars as "the Chronicler", and had the final shape established in late fifth or fourth century BCE. This chapter belongs to the section focusing on the kingdom of Judah until its destruction by the Babylonians under Nebuchadnezzar and the beginning of restoration under Cyrus the Great of Persia  (2 Chronicles 10 to 36). It contains the regnal accounts of Josiah the king of Judah.

Text
This chapter was originally written in the Hebrew language and is divided into 27 verses.

Textual witnesses
Some early manuscripts containing the text of this chapter in Hebrew are of the Masoretic Text tradition, which includes the Aleppo Codex (10th century), and Codex Leningradensis (1008).

There is also a translation into Koine Greek known as the Septuagint, made in the last few centuries BCE. Extant ancient manuscripts of the Septuagint version include Codex Vaticanus (B; B; 4th century), and Codex Alexandrinus (A; A; 5th century).

Old Testament references
: 
:

Analysis
This chapter can be divided into three sections:
the Passover feast, which was celebrated after Josiah's reforms (verses 1–19)
Josiah's death (verses 20–24)
the concluding remark on his reign (verses 25–27)

Josiah Restores the Passover (35:1–19)

Verse 1
Now Josiah kept a Passover to the LORD in Jerusalem, and they slaughtered the Passover lambs on the fourteenth day of the first month.
"The fourteenth day of the first month": in accordance to ). In the time of Hezekiah, under special circumstances, it was celebrated on the 14th day of the second month.  reported that the event was in "the eighteenth year of king Josiah."

Verse 3
Then he said to the Levites who taught all Israel, who were holy to the LORD: “Put the holy ark in the house which Solomon the son of David, king of Israel, built. It shall no longer be a burden on your shoulders. Now serve the LORD your God and His people Israel.
 "Put the holy ark in the house": this could indicate that the ark may have been removed from the temple during Manasseh's reign.

Josiah's death (35:20–27)
The report in this section has been regarded by some commentaries as historically more reliable and with clearer explanation about the event than that in the Books of Kings. The description of Josiah's armor, his wounding, and his order to be taken to Jerusalem is quite similar to that of Ahab (34). Although the passage and the Talmud attribute the lamentations to Jeremiah, Mathys suggests that Zechariah 12:9–14 may be the one referred in verses 24b–25, as it seems to refer to Josiah's death.

Verse 20
After all this, when Josiah had prepared the temple, Necho king of Egypt came up to fight against Carchemish by the Euphrates; and Josiah went out against him.
The reference to Carchemish on the Euphrates (verse 20) uses similar wording as in Jeremiah 46:2. The Battle of Carchemish was eventually fought in 605 BCE where the Babylonian and Median army led by Nebuchadnezzar II destroyed the combined Egyptian and Assyrian forces, ending the existence of the Assyrian empire and eliminating Egypt's significant role in the Ancient Near East since that time.

See also

Related Bible parts: Exodus 12, Deuteronomy 16, 2 Kings 23, 2 Kings 24

Notes

References

Sources

External links
 Jewish translations:
 Divrei Hayamim II - II Chronicles - Chapter 35 (Judaica Press). English translation [with Rashi's commentary] at Chabad.org
 Christian translations:
 Online Bible at GospelHall.org (ESV, KJV, Darby, American Standard Version, Bible in Basic English)
 2 Chronicles chapter 35. Bible Gateway

35